

Relay

1200m Sprint

Race (Classic, interval)

Race (Free, mass start) 

2007 Canada Winter Games